was a Japanese author and social critic.

She was awarded the 1968 Akutagawa Prize for Sanbiki no kani (Three Crabs), and the 1982 Tanizaki Prize for Katachi mo naku (寂兮寥兮).

Ōba suffered a stroke in 1996 and died on May 24, 2007.

Selected works 
 Sanbiki no kani (Three Crabs), 1968.
 Funakuimushi (ふなくい虫), Tokyo : Kodansha, 1970.
 Yūreitachi no fukkatsusai, 1970
 Sabita kotoba, 1971.
 Shishu sabita kotoba (A Poetry Collection of Tarnished Words), 1971.
 Tsuga no yume, 1971.
 Uo no namida, 1971.
 Kokyū o hiku tori, 1972.
 Yasō no yume, 1973.
 Aoi kitsune, Tokyo : Kodansha, 1975.
 Garakuta hakubutsukan, 1975.
 Yamauba no Bisho (The Smile of the Mountain Witch), 1976,
 Urashimasō, 1977.
 Aoi chiisana hanashi, 1978.
 Samete miru yume, 1978.
 Hāna to mushi no kioku, 1979.
 Onna no danseiron, 1979.
 Taidan sei to shite no onna, 1979.
 Tankō, 1979.
 Katachi mo naku (寂兮寥兮), Tokyo : Kawade Shobō Shinsha, 1982.
 Shima no kuni no shima (島の国の島), Tokyo : Ushio Shuppansha, 1982.
 Kakeru otoko no yokogao (駈ける男の横顔), Tokyo : Chūō Kōronsha, 1984.
 Mae mae katatsumuri (舞へ舞へ蝸牛), Tokyo : Fukutake Shoten, 1984.
 Naku tori no (啼く鳥の), Tokyo : Kodansha, 1985.
 Onna otoko inochi (女・男・いのち), Tokyo : Yomiuri Shinbunsha, 1985.
 Onna (女), Tokyo : Sakuhinsha, 1987.
 Manʾyōshu (万葉集), Tokyo : Kōdansha, 1989.
 Kaoru ki no uta : haha to musume no ōfuku shokan (郁る樹の詩: 母と娘の往復書簡), Tokyo : Chūō Kōronsha, 1992.
 Nihyakunen (二百年), Tokyo : Kodansha, 1993.
 Yuki (雪), Tokyo : Fukutake Shoten, 1993.
 Warabeuta mutan (わらべ唄夢譚), Tokyo : Kawade Shobō Shinsha, 1995.

English translations 
 Tarnished Words: The Poetry of Oba Minako, translated by Janice Brown. EastBridge, Signature Books Series, 2005. .
 Of Birds Crying, translated by Michiko N. Wilson and Michael K. Wilson.  Cornell East Asia Series, 2011.

Bibliography 
 Gender Is Fair Game: (Re)Thinking the (Fe)Male in the Works of Oba Minako, by Michiko Niikuni Wilson, M. E. Sharpe, 1998, .

External links
 J'Lit | Authors : Minako Oba* | Books from Japan 

Japanese women novelists
1930 births
2007 deaths
Akutagawa Prize winners
20th-century novelists
International Writing Program alumni